The Nakahara Prize (中原賞) is an annual award given by the Japanese Economic Association to Japanese economists under the age of 45 whose work has gained international recognition. The prize was created in 1995, and named after its sponsor Nobuyuki Nakahara. The aim of the prize is honoring and encouraging young (under 45 years) economists to publish internationally well-recognized papers and books. In 2016, Sagiri Kitao became the first woman awarded the prize.

Recipients

See also
John Bates Clark Medal
Yrjö Jahnsson Award
Gossen Prize
 List of economics awards

External links
Japanese Economic Association: Nakahara Prize

Economics awards
Japanese science and technology awards
Awards with age limits